L.A.con is the name given to four of the six Worldcons held in or near Los Angeles, California. All four were held in Anaheim.

 L.A.con I, 1972
 L.A.con II, 1984
 L.A.con III, 1996
 L.A.con IV, 2006

(The other two were Pacificon I, in 1946, and Solacon in 1958.)